The Pakistan Education and Research Network (PERN) connects universities and research institutes through high-speed Internet bandwidth. The main purpose of this network is to facilitate researchers/students in sharing data and to coordinate with each other though video conferencing.
Currently 60(Pakistani) educational institutes are interconnected; in the future the PERN-II project would further include 59 other educational institutes national-wide at speeds of up to 10 Gbps. Another Institute Future Pakistan International is determined to restore scientific culture in Pakistan.

List of universities interconnected

Notes
 Reference of table Connection summary
 Column heading of Cities: Islamabad Lahore and Karachi Represent "Location of Routers" placed in.

Membership and affiliation
 PERN (Pakistan Educational Research Network) is primary member of APAN (Asia Pacific Advanced Network) Reference 
 PERN has mirror site of MIT OpenCourseWare,

PERN architecture
[[If you want more than https://thecitynotes.com

See also
 Higher Education Commission
 Pakistan Academy of Sciences
 Hussain Ebrahim Jamal Research Institute of Chemistry

References

External links
 PERN Official Website
 Pakistan International
Partners links:
 MIT OpenCourseWare Mirror site
 NTC developer of PERN
 Future Pakistan International

[[ Learn Education Guides ]]

Education in Pakistan
Internet in Pakistan